This table displays the top-rated primetime television series of the 2016–17 season, as measured by Nielsen Media Research.

References

2016 in American television
2017 in American television
2016-related lists
2017-related lists
Lists of American television series